Henry Aiken may refer to:

 Henry Aiken Worcester (1802–1841), American minister
 Henry David Aiken (1912–1982), American philosopher
 Henry Aiken (figure skater)